Hemiconus is an extinct genus of sea snails, marine gastropod mollusks, in the family Conidae the cone snails and their allies.

Species
Species within the genus Hemiconus include:
 † Hemiconus angulifer Cossmann & Pissarro, 1901
 † Hemiconus auriculatus Tracey & Craig, 2017
 † Hemiconus constantinensis Tracey & Craig, 2017
 † Hemiconus cryptoconoides Cossmann & Pissarro, 1901
 † Hemiconus disjunctus (Deshayes, 1865)
 † Hemiconus douvillei Cossmann & Pissarro, 1901
 † Hemiconus gouetensis Cossmann, 1897
 † Hemiconus granatinus (Deshayes, 1865)
 † Hemiconus granularis (Borson, 1820)
 † Hemiconus lateralis Tracey & Craig, 2017
 † Hemiconus leroyi Tracey & Craig, 2017
 † Hemiconus peraratus Cossmann, 1897
 † Hemiconus pissarroi Tracey & Craig, 2017
 † Hemiconus scabriculus (Solander, 1766)
 † Hemiconus stromboides (Lamarck, 1802)
 † Hemiconus tremletti Le Renard, 1994
 † Hemiconus trisulcatus Tracey & Craig, 2017
 † Hemiconus tromelini (Vasseur, 1882)
 † Hemiconus turbinopsis (Deshayes, 1865)

References

External links
 Cossmann M. (1889). Catalogue illustré des coquilles fossiles de l'Éocène des environs de Paris. Annales de la Société Royale Malacologique de Belgique. 24: 3-381, 12 pls

 
Conidae